Pseudotetrapterus (Greek for "false four fins") is a genus of prehistoric fish from the Oligocene.

References
Pseudotetrapterus, Paleobiology Database

Acanthomorpha
Oligocene fish